Little Negro Bu-ci-bu, also mentioned as Buci-Bu, was the first Slovene comic strip. It was created by Milko Bambič and published in 1927 in the children's column of the monthly Naš glas (Our Voice) in Trieste. It is a story about an arrogant and tyrannic black king that with his false wisdom leads his people to ruin and commits suicide. It caused a controversy, because it was seen as a parody on the Italian leader Mussolini, and the author predicted his demise. The Italian Fascist authorities forbade Bambič's works. He escaped from Trieste to Yugoslavia to avoid arrest.

References

External links
"Bu-ci-bujevo rojstvo" in Naš glas, p. 289

Slovene comic strips
Comics about politics
1927 comics debuts
Comics characters introduced in 1927
Black people in comics
Fictional kings
Comics set in Africa
Male characters in comics